Marc C. Flur (born June 8, 1962) is a former professional tennis player from the United States.

Early life
Flur was born in New York but grew up in Vermont.

College tennis
He played collegiate tennis for Duke University. A member of the Duke Hall of Fame, he is considered to be the greatest tennis player in the school's history.  In 1983 he won both All-American selection and the ACC Player of the Year award. He was a winner of five ACC Championships, two of them in singles.

Tour career
The American took part in all four Grand Slam tournaments in 1985 and reached the second round in three of them. This included two wins over British player Jeremy Bates. The only other time he made it past the first round was in the 1987 US Open, where he defeated Christian Saceanu in five sets. At the US Open the following year, he had his best doubles result, making the third round, with partner Sammy Giammalva, Jr. Two years earlier, the pair had been runners-up in the Livingston Open, the only Grand Prix final that Flur would ever play in. As a singles player, the furthest he went was a semi-final appearance in the 1987 Livingston Open. The only other occasion that he had three wins in a tournament was at Delray Beach in 1985. One of those victories was over world number 15 Joakim Nyström.

Grand Prix career finals

Doubles: 1 (0–1)

Challenger titles

Singles: (1)

Doubles: (1)

References

1962 births
Living people
American male tennis players
Tennis people from New York (state)
Duke Blue Devils men's tennis players